The 2021 KML Playoffs was the postseason tournament of the Korvpalli Meistriliiga's 2020–21 season. The playoffs began on 19 April and ended on 17 May. The games were played without spectators due to COVID-19 pandemic. The tournament concluded with BC Kalev/Cramo defeating Pärnu Sadam three games to one in the finals. Chavaughn Lewis was named KML Finals MVP.

Bracket
</onlyinclude>

Quarterfinals
The quarterfinals are best-of-three series.

Pärnu Sadam vs. Tallinna Kalev/TLÜ

AVIS UTILITAS Rapla vs. Tartu Ülikool Maks & Moorits

Rakvere Tarvas vs. TalTech

Semifinals
The quarterfinals are best-of-five series.

BC Kalev/Cramo vs. Rakvere Tarvas

Pärnu Sadam vs. AVIS UTILITAS Rapla

Third place games
The third place games are best-of-five series.

AVIS UTILITAS Rapla vs. Rakvere Tarvas

Finals
The finals are best-of-five series.

BC Kalev/Cramo vs. Pärnu Sadam

References

External links

Korvpalli Meistriliiga playoffs
2021 KML Playoffs